The Segunda División de El Salvador (Second Division of El Salvador) is the second tier of football in El Salvador governed by the Federación Salvadoreña de Fútbol (FESFUT). Teams contest to promote to the Primera División.

The winning sides of the annual Apertura and Clausura contest each other, the winner directly promotes to Primera División.

The losing side of the match contest the last place team of Primera División to trigger promotion and relegation should the Primera División team lose to the Segunda División side.

History
The Salvadoran Football Federation decided to improve the quality and competitiveness of football.

Segunda División, also called Liga B, was created in 1950 divided into two groups to contest within each group. The top sides of each group then contested in order that the winner directly promotes to Primera División.

Category of Ascent was made of 12 teams, four teams in each zone: central, western and eastern.

The founding 12 teams in Segunda División were ANTEL, Atlético Marte, Marte Soyapango, Caterpillar de San Salvador, Picapiedra del Plan de la Laguna, Antiguo Cuscatlán, Dragón, Once Municipal, Molino F. C, Ahuachapán and Puertas de Santa Ana y San Rafael.

The inaugural President of the Segunda División was Dr Mauro Alfredo Bernal Silva.

The number of teams increased up to twelve teams per zone (36 teams altogether). In 1986 the Legislative Assembly emitted a decree in the Reforms to the Law of Football and the Category of Ascent that Segunda División would be limited to only 24 teams split into two groups.

In 2007, Segunda División adopted an Apertura and Clausura format.

Members of the Segunda División  (2020–21 season) 
The league currently consists of the following 24 teams:

Stadium and locations

Team Group A

Team Group B

Division set-up

Changes in division set-up 
 Number of clubs: currently 24. From TBD to TBD there were two divisions, each of 20 teams. From TBD to TBD it had 20. The 1991–92 season was played in two groups of 12 teams each; TBD again in one group with 24 teams, TBD with 20 teams.
 Teams promoted to the Primera División de Fútbol de El Salvador (La Primera): 3; 1981–1991 there was a promotion/relegation round, in 1991–92 there was 1 promotion per group.
 Number of relegations into the Regionalliga (until 1994: Oberliga): 4; 1991–92: 2–3 per group (inclusive relegation); 1992–93: 7.

Promotion and relegation 
 From 2007 until 2010, the winner of the Apertura and Clausura would play for automatic promotion, where the loser of the match would play a playoff with the team that finished 9th in La Primera.
After this, and to the present, the winner of the Apertura and Clausura face in a final game with only the winner gaining promotion to La Primera.
 Until the 2015–16 season, the bottom three teams were relegated into the Tercera Division. Since the 2016–17, the bottom three teams of each group play in a round robin tournament; the bottom team of that round robin tournament are relegated to the Tercera Division.

League matches derbies and classics in Segunda División
 Atletico Apopa vs Vendaval Apopa "Clásico de Apopa" (last played in  )
 Independiente FC vs CD Platense "Clásico Paracentral" (last played in  )

President

League champions
Source:

References

External links

 
2
El Salvador
Sports leagues established in 1950
1950 establishments in El Salvador